The Bangladesh women's under-19 cricket team represents Bangladesh in international under-19 women's cricket. The team is administrated by the Bangladesh Cricket Board (BCB).

The team played their first official matches at the 2023 ICC Under-19 Women's T20 World Cup, the first ever international women's under-19 cricket competition, in which they reached the Super Six stage.

History
The inaugural Women's Under-19 World Cup was scheduled to take place in January 2021, but was postponed multiple times due to the COVID-19 pandemic. The tournament was eventually scheduled to take place in 2023, in South Africa. As a Full Member of the ICC, Bangladesh qualified automatically for the tournament.

Bangladesh announced their 15-player squad for the tournament in December 2022. The side reached the Super Six stage, in which they finished third in their group.

Squad
The table below lists all the players who have been selected in recent squads for Bangladesh under-19s. Currently, this only includes the squad for the 2023 ICC Under-19 Women's T20 World Cup.

Records & statistics
International match summary

As of 25 January 2023

Youth Women's Twenty20 record versus other nations

As of 25 January 2023

Leading runs scorers

Leading wickets takers

Highest individual innings

Highest individual bowling figures

Highest team totals

Lowest team totals

Under-19 World Cup record

References

Women's Under-19 cricket teams
C
Bangladesh in international cricket